Yassine Mohamed El Ghazali Titraoui (born 26 August 2003 in M'Sila) is an Algerian professional footballer who plays for Paradou AC and the Algeria national under-23 football team.

Club career 
Titraoui made his professional debut for Paradou AC on the 9 August 2021, replacing Kaassis in a 2–1 Ligue Professionnelle 1 away loss against USM Alger.

International career 
Already an under-20 international with Algeria, Titraoui was selected to the senior squad by Madjid Bougherra in November 2021, to take part in the FIFA Arab Cup.

Honours
Algeria
FIFA Arab Cup: 2021

References

External links

2003 births
Living people
Algerian footballers
Algeria youth international footballers
Algeria international footballers
Association football midfielders
Paradou AC players
Algerian Ligue Professionnelle 1 players
People from M'Sila